Blood on the Moon is a 1948 RKO black-and-white "psychological" Western film noir starring Robert Mitchum, Barbara Bel Geddes, Robert Preston and Walter Brennan. Directed by Robert Wise, the cinematography is by Nicholas Musuraca. The movie was shot in California as well as some of the more scenic shots at Red Rock Crossing, Sedona, Arizona. The picture is based on the novel Gunman's Chance by Luke Short.

Plot
Drifter Jim Garry is summoned by his friend, smooth-talking Tate Riling. Garry rides into an Indian reservation and finds himself in the middle of a conflict between a cattle owner and some homesteaders. He meets cattle owner John Lufton, who asks Garry to deliver a note to his family.
While delivering the message, Garry is confronted by Lufton's daughter Amy, and eventually meets his other daughter, Carol. The Luftons suspect that Garry is on Riling's side and are initially hostile, especially Amy. 
Riling tells Garry that he and his partner, Indian agent Jake Pindalest, have devised an elaborate scheme to force Lufton into selling his herd cheaply. Pindalest has rejected Lufton's cattle as unfit to feed the Indians and ordered him to remove his herd from the reservation within a week. Meanwhile, Riling has organized the homesteaders into blocking the move, conning them into believing that he is working in their interest. With no other option, Lufton would have to sell his herd at bargain prices or lose everything. Lufton would never sell to Riling, but he would to a stranger like Garry. Pindalest would then see that the government buys the herd. Riling offers Garry $10,000 for his part in the swindle.

Lufton manages to outsmart Riling and move his herd off the reservation unimpeded; he and Amy assume (incorrectly) Garry read the note, which described the route he wanted Riling to think he planned to take, but Riling was actually tipped off by Lufton's other daughter, Carol, who is in love with Riling. Riling and his men find the cattle eventually and stampede them back onto the reservation. There is not enough time to gather the herd together and move the herd. Garry becomes disgusted when a young man is killed in the stampede, and he switches sides. Amy still does not trust him. Eventually, she comes to trust (and fall in love with) Garry, especially after he stops two of Riling's men from gunning her father down.

To buy time, Garry deceives Pindalest, who is unaware of his break with Riling, into sending a messenger to the government to extend the deadline. Garry then takes Pindalest prisoner. Riling and his gang track them down. Garry flees to the cabin of Kris Barden, the father of the young man killed in the stampede; they are joined by Amy. A gunfight erupts. Though wounded earlier, Garry sneaks out at night, knocks Pindalest out and dispatches Riling's two henchmen. That leaves the two old friends to face each other. Riling is fatally wounded. Pindalest is taken into custody, and Garry decides to give up his wandering ways, much to Amy's delight.

Cast

 Robert Mitchum as Jim Garry
 Barbara Bel Geddes as Amy Lufton
 Robert Preston as Tate Riling
 Walter Brennan as Kris Barden
 Phyllis Thaxter as Carol Lufton
 Frank Faylen as Jake Pindalest
 Tom Tully as John Lufton
 Charles McGraw as Milo Sweet

 Clifton Young as Joe Shotten
 Tom Tyler as Frank Reardon
 George Cooper as Fred Barden
 Tom Keene as Ted Elser
 Bud Osborne as Cap Willis
 Zon Murray as Nels Titterton
 Robert Bray as Bart Daniels

Production

The idea for Blood on the Moon (based on Luke Short's Gunman's Chance) came from Robert Wise and Theron Warth, who pitched the idea to producer Dore Schary as a mood piece akin to Out of the Past and Crossfire, both produced by RKO. Schary agreed to produce the film and signed Lillie Hayward to write the screenplay.

Talent agency Famous Artists offered RKO a deal with either James Stewart or Robert Mitchum in the leading role of Jim Garry, and Jacques Tourneur as director, but Schary refused the deal and backed up Wise as director. Wise enjoyed working with Mitchum and liked that he offered suggestions. When Mitchum showed up to the set dressed up in costume, Walter Brennan exclaimed: "That is the realest goddamnest cowboy I've ever seen!" 

Filming of Blood on the Moon began in February 1948 and ended in May of the same year, with Sedona, Arizona, the Rocky Mountains, California, Utah and New Mexico serving as locations. Inspired by the production design of Citizen Kane (which Wise co-edited), Wise had the interior sets built with visible low-ceilings. In order to create the night scenes of the film, Wise and cinematographer Nicholas Musuraca utilized infrared film, which in Musuraca's opinion, could cause headaches regarding problems with color of clothing and tone of makeup.

The bar brawl between Garry and Rilling took three days to shoot. Wise wanted a realistic fight where the winner comes out on top badly beaten and exhausted instead of the usual Western brawls and had Mitchum and Preston do the fight instead of stunt doubles.

Production of the film dragged on due to bad weather. Wise noted that none of the weather reports that the crew received got the weather forecast right. After the film was completed, Howard Hughes terminated Barbara Bel Geddes' contract with RKO, believing she was not sexy enough.

Reception

Critical response
The New York Times gave the film a good review and lauded Robert Mitchum's acting and Lillie Hayward's screenplay:

...Blood on the Moon still stands out from run-of-the-range action dramas. The reason is obvious enough. This picture has a sound, sensible story to tell and, besides, it is well acted. Robert Mitchum carries the burden of the film and his acting is superior all the way...Lillie Hayward's screen play, taken from a novel by Luke Short, is solidly constructed and by not over-emphasizing Jim Garry's inherent honesty, she has permitted Mr. Mitchum to illuminate a character that is reasonable and most always interesting. The same can be said of the rancher's daughter, whom Miss Bel Geddes represents. Others who give worthy help include Walter Brennan, Mr. Preston, Phyllis Thaxter, Frank Faylen and Tom Tully. And a word should be said, too, for the direction by Robert Wise. A comparative newcomer to the directorial ranks, he has managed to keep the atmosphere of this leisurely paced film charged with impending violence.

The film was also reviewed favorably by Variety magazine:

Blood on the Moon is a terse, tightly-drawn western drama. There's none of the formula approach to its story telling. Picture captures the crisp style used by Luke Short in writing his western novels...Picture's pace has a false sense of leisureliness that points up several tough moments of action. There is a deadly knock-down and drag-out fist fight between Mitchum and Preston; a long chase across snow-covered mountains and the climax gun battle between Preston's henchmen and Mitchum, Brennan and Bel Geddes that are loaded with suspense wallop.

Home media
Blood on the Moon was released on Blu-ray and DVD by the Warner Archive Collection in 2020.

References

External links
 
 
 
 
 

1948 films
1948 Western (genre) films
American Western (genre) films
American black-and-white films
1940s English-language films
Film noir
Films scored by Roy Webb
Films based on American novels
Films based on Western (genre) novels
Films directed by Robert Wise
Films shot in Arizona
RKO Pictures films
Revisionist Western (genre) films
1940s American films